Le Monestier-du-Percy is a commune in the Isère department in southeastern France.

Population

See also
Communes of the Isère department
Parc naturel régional du Vercors

References

Communes of Isère
Isère communes articles needing translation from French Wikipedia